A  is an unlined cotton summer kimono, worn in casual settings such as summer festivals and to nearby bathhouses. Originally worn as bathrobes, their modern use is much broader, and are a common sight in Japan during summer. Though  are traditionally indigo and white in colour, modern  commonly feature multicoloured designs, and are designed to be machine washable.

Construction and wear
 are worn by men and women. Like other forms of traditional Japanese clothing,  are made with straight seams and wide sleeves.

Traditionally,  were mostly made of indigo-dyed cotton; however, following an increase in popularity in the late 1990s, a wide variety of colours and designs are now available, worn by both men and women.

Customs

Though historically,  were worn traditionally as a bathrobe all-year round, in the present day this is uncommonly seen, and is mainly confined to  resort towns such as Atami, Kinosaki and Kusatsu, where  are still worn as bathrobes, commonly gifted to guests as part of their stay at a specific hotel or inn.

See also

References

External links

Dresses
Japanese full-body garments
Robes and cloaks
Articles containing video clips
Japanese words and phrases